Maurice Edward Johnson (born January 9, 1967) is a former American football tight end who played four seasons with the Philadelphia Eagles of the National Football League. He played college football at Temple University and attended Roosevelt High School in Washington, D.C. He was also a member of the Frankfurt Galaxy of the World League of American Football.

References

External links
Just Sports Stats
Fanbase profile

Living people
1967 births
Players of American football from Washington, D.C.
American football tight ends
African-American players of American football
Temple Owls football players
Philadelphia Eagles players
Frankfurt Galaxy players
21st-century African-American people
20th-century African-American sportspeople